Geronimo or Gerónimo is a masculine given name, the Italian and Spanish form of Jerome.  Jerónimo is an alternative Spanish spelling of Gerónimo. It is also a surname.

People with the name include:

Given name
 Geronimo (1829–1909), Chiricahua Apache leader who fought the United States
 Gerónimo de Aguilar (1489–1531), Franciscan friar involved in the Spanish conquest of the Aztec Empire
 Geronimo Albertini, Catholic prelate and Bishop of Avellino e Frigento (1545–1548)
 Gerónimo Barbadillo (born 1954), Peruvian retired footballer
 Gerónimo Beato (born 1995), Uruguayan footballer
 Gerónimo Berroa (born 1965), retired Major League Baseball player
 Geronimo Bruni (before 1660–after 1670), Italian painter
 Gerónimo Castillón y Salas (1756–1835), Spanish bishop and last Grand Inquisitor of Spain
 Geronimo Cristobal (born 1986), Filipino writer
 Gerónimo Gil (born 1975), retired Major League Baseball player
 Geronimo Mercuriali (1530–1606), Italian philologist and physician
 Geronimo Meynier (born 1941), Italian retired film actor
 Gerónimo Ovelar, Paraguayan footballer of the 1970s and '80s
 Gerónimo Peña (born 1967), retired Major League Baseball player
 Geronimo Pratt (1947–2011), high-ranking member of the Black Panther Party
 Gerónimo Ramírez, mid-17th century Spanish painter
 Gerónimo Rulli (born 1992), Argentine football goalkeeper
 Gerónimo Saccardi (1949–2002), Argentine football midfielder and manager
 Geronimo Saccheri (1667–1733), Italian mathematician

Surname
 César Gerónimo (born 1948), Major League Baseball player
 Licerio Gerónimo (1855–1924), general of the Philippines
 Sarah Geronimo (born 1988), Filipina actress

See also
 Geronimus (disambiguation), a list of people with the surname
 Hieronymus (disambiguation), a related Latin given name
 Jerome (disambiguation)

Italian masculine given names
Spanish masculine given names